Web Soup was an American weekly infotainment series that aired on the G4 cable network. The show premiered on June 7, 2009, and was hosted by Chris Hardwick. The series focused on commenting on the latest viral videos, and had a very similar style as its sister network E!'s series The Soup.

During the first two seasons, this show was taped in front of a green screen like The Soup. In the third season, the program taped on the set usually utilized by E! News with added studio audience seating.  Chris Hardwick confirmed via a comment on his website that season three was the last and the show would not continue. However, repackaged archived episodes returned to G4's schedule from December 2012 until the network's closure on December 31, 2014.

References

External links
 
 

2009 American television series debuts
2011 American television series endings
2000s American satirical television series
2010s American satirical television series
2000s American video clip television series
2010s American video clip television series
American television spin-offs
English-language television shows
Television shows filmed in Los Angeles
G4 (American TV network) original programming
Mass media about Internet culture
Television series about social media
Internet memes